This is a list of inductees into the Pro Football Hall of Fame that includes inductees who played or coached for franchises that are no longer active. The "charter" class of seventeen was selected in 1963.

Enshrinees are selected by a 44-person Selection Committee which meets each year at the time and location of the Super Bowl.  Current rules of the committee stipulate that between four and seven individuals are selected each year.  Any person may nominate an individual to the hall, provided the nominee has not played or coached for at least five seasons prior to the nomination. Not including the charter class, 67 players have been inducted in their first year of eligibility.

In addition to the regular Selection Committee, which primarily focuses on contributions made over the past approximately thirty seasons, a nine-member Seniors Committee (which is a subset of the larger committee) submits two nominees each year whose contributions came prior to 1985.  These nominees are referred as "Seniors nominees" (formerly "old-timer" nominees).

Two Hall of Famers, Joe Guyon and another Indian halfback, Jim Thorpe, stayed paired together from 1919–1924 on four defunct teams. Starting with the 1919–1920 Canton Bulldogs, they next played for the 1921 Cleveland Indians, 1922–1923 Oorang Indians, and the 1924 Rock Island Independents.

Hall of Famers by team 

Hall of Famers who made the major part of their primary contribution for any club have a bronze star in the right column. 
Hall of Famers who spent only a minor portion of their career with a club are listed without the star, and the team list where they made their major contribution is linked in the column.
These tables use the Pro Football Hall of Fame enshrinees by Team list to credit the Hall of Famers with stars.
The statistical and biographical information came from the Pro Football Hall of Fame website.
The list is complete up to the 2013 Hall of Fame class.

Akron, Baltimore, Boston, Brooklyn

Canton, Cleveland, Columbus, Dallas

 All Career Highlights listed at the Pro Football Hall of Fame website.

Detroit, Duluth, Frankford, Hammond

 All Career Highlights listed at the Pro Football Hall of Fame website.

Kansas City, Milwaukee, New York

 All Career Highlights listed at the Pro Football Hall of Fame website.

Oorang, Pottsville, Providence

 All Career Highlights listed at the Pro Football Hall of Fame website.

Rock Island, Staten Island, Washington

 All Career Highlights listed at the Pro Football Hall of Fame website.

See also 
 List of Pro Football Hall of Fame inductees

References

External links 
 
 

List
National Football League lists